Rashid Al-Barashdy (Arabic:راشد البراشدي) (born 17 January 1999) is a Qatari born-Qatari footballer. He currently plays as a Forward.

Career
Al-Barashdy started his career at Qatar SC and is a product of the Qatar's youth system. On 27 September 2018, Al-Barashdy made his professional debut for Qatar SC against Al-Sadd in the Pro League.

External links

References

Living people
1999 births
Qatari footballers
Omani footballers
Naturalised citizens of Qatar
Qatar SC players
Qatar Stars League players
Association football defenders
Place of birth missing (living people)